Black Widows is a Nordic television series created by Mikko Pöllä, directed by Venita Ozols-Graham and starring Cecilia Forss as Rebeka Axelsson, Beate Bille as Kira Just Bergman and Synnøve Macody Lund as Johanne Rønningen. It is a remake of the Finnish 2014 TV series Mustat lesket.

The series follows three best friends who are all in abusive marriages and whose husbands work at the same company. The women go through a life-changing event after their husbands die in an explosion during a boating trip.

Produced by the Finnish company , Black Widows is a Nordic collaboration: the production team is mainly Finnish, but the cast and the directors are Scandinavian. Although shot almost entirely in Finland, the series is set in Scandinavia.

References

External links 
 

2016 Finnish television series debuts
2016 Swedish television series debuts